Trần Đại Quang (12 October 1956 – 21 September 2018) was a Vietnamese politician and former police general who served as the eighth President of Vietnam from 2016 until his death in 2018. After serving for five years as the Minister of Public Security (2011 – 2016), Quang was nominated by his predecessor Trương Tấn Sang to the presidency and was elected to the post by the National Assembly of Vietnam on 2 April 2016. He was one of the country's top leaders and ranked second in the Politburo behind Nguyễn Phú Trọng, the Communist Party General Secretary.

Early life 
Trần Đại Quang was born on 12 October 1956 in Ninh Bình Province, in what was then the Democratic Republic of Vietnam. His father worked as a fish catcher in the river, while his mother worked as a banana seller. They had six children, four of them boys. Later his father died. His mother struggled to raise the children. Trần Đại Quang helped his mother in farming. He was well known for hard work, dedication, composure and calm qualities.

Political career 
Trần Đại Quang previously served as Minister of Public Security from 2011 to 2016, Vice Head of Committee on HIV / AIDS Prevention from 2011 to 2014, and President of the Viet Nam Red Cross Society from 2017 to 2018. He was a member of the 12th Politburo of the Communist Party of Vietnam, in which he was ranked second, after General Secretary Nguyễn Phú Trọng.

Trần Đại Quang joined the Communist Party of Vietnam on 26 July 1980 and became officially party member on 26 July 1981. And from 1997 he became a member of the Politburo of the Communist Party of Vietnam and a member of the Central Committee of the party.

At the 12th Congress of the Communist Party of Vietnam in January 2016 Trần Đại Quang was nominated President of the Socialist Republic of Vietnam and confirmed on 2 April 2016 by the National Assembly of Vietnam. On that day, he succeeded Trương Tấn Sang. On the same day he proposed Nguyễn Xuân Phúc as the new head of government. He died in office on 21 September 2018, from a viral disease, aged 61.

Honors 
: Fatherland Defense Order (2011) 
: Military Exploit Order 1st class (2011) 
: Military Exploit Order 1st class (2015) 
: Order of José Martí (2016) 
: Order of National Gold (2017) 
: Military Exploit Order 2nd class
: Military Exploit Order 3rd class
: Feat Order 1st class
: Feat Order 2nd class
: Feat Order 3rd class
: Friendship Order 1st class

Personal life 
Trần Đại Quang was married to Madam Nguyễn Thị Hiền, who performed ceremonial functions as the de facto First Lady of Vietnam.

Trần Đại Quang was the second son in the family of four brothers Vinh, Quang, Sáng, Tỏ, and two sisters. His youngest brother is Trần Quốc Tỏ, who is the party secretary (governor) for Thái Nguyên Province.

Death 
Trần Đại Quang died at the 108 Military Central Hospital on 21 September 2018 in Hanoi from complications of a viral disease at the age of 61 while in office. On 27 September, a state funeral was held in Hanoi, followed by a procession to his home town in Kim Sơn District, Ninh Binh where he was buried. The memorial service was attended by many Vietnamese politicians and foreign dignitaries, including:
 Secretary General of the WFTU, George Mavrikos
 Secretary General of ASEAN, Lim Jock Hoi
 President of Vietnam, Nguyễn Phú Trọng and other top Vietnamese politicians
 Prime Minister of Cambodia, Hun Sen
 Vice President of Laos, Phankham Viphavanh
 Deputy Prime Minister of Singapore, Teo Chee Hean
 Deputy Prime Minister of Malaysia, Wan Azizah Wan Ismail
 Chief of Staff to the State Councillor of Myanmar, Thaung Tun
 Special Envoy of the President of Indonesia, Ma'ruf Amin
 Deputy Prime Minister of Thailand, Chatchai Sarikulya
 Member of the Politburo Standing Committee of China, Zhao Leji
 Prime Minister of South Korea, Lee Nak-yeon
 Minister of Justice of Japan, Yoko Kamikawa and Secretary General of the LDP, Toshihiro Nikai
 Former President of Mozambique, Armando Guebuza
 Vice President of the State Duma of Russia, Olga Epifanova
 Speaker of the Council of Belarus, Mikhail Myasnikovich
 Vice President of Cuba, Roberto Morales Ojeda
and several ambassadors and diplomats from 50 other countries and organizations.

On 29 September, the United Nations General Assembly held a minute of silence to mourn his death.

Published works 
 "Cyberspace – Future and Action", 2015
 The people have the strength to protect the National Security, 2015

References 

1956 births
Presidents of Vietnam
Government ministers of Vietnam
2018 deaths
Members of the 11th Politburo of the Communist Party of Vietnam
Members of the 12th Politburo of the Communist Party of Vietnam
Members of the 10th Central Committee of the Communist Party of Vietnam
Members of the 11th Central Committee of the Communist Party of Vietnam
Members of the 12th Central Committee of the Communist Party of Vietnam
People from Ninh Bình province
Infectious disease deaths in Vietnam